Emma Kowal  is an Australian cultural and medical anthropologist, physician and scholar of science and technology studies. She is most well known for her books Trapped in the Gap: Doing Good in Indigenous Australia, and the co-edited volumes of Force, Movement, Intensity: The Newtonian Imagination in the Humanities and Social Sciences (with Ghassan Hage), Cryopolitics: Frozen Life in a Melting World (with Joanna Radin).

Early life and education
She received her Bachelor of Medicine and Bachelor of Surgery and a Bachelor of Arts in history and philosophy of science from University of Melbourne in 2000 and worked for a few years as a physician and a public health professional in the Northern Territory of Australia. She returned to the University of Melbourne to receive her PhD in public health anthropology in 2007. She is currently a professor in Anthropology at Deakin University and Convenor of the Deakin Science and Society Network.

Career
In 2014, she received the Paul Bourke Award for Early Career Research from the Academy of the Social Sciences in Australia. She was the deputy director for the National Centre for Indigenous Genomics at Australian National University between 2013 and 2017. In 2019 she was elected to the Fellowship of the Academy of the Social Sciences in Australia. Since 2021 Emma Kowal is president of the Society for Social Studies of Science. She was elected a Fellow of the Australian Academy of Health and Medical Sciences in 2022.

Publications
Emma Kowal has contributed to a large number of scholarly articles.

References 

Australian anthropologists
Science and technology studies scholars
Australian women anthropologists
Medical anthropologists
Living people
University of Melbourne alumni
Academic staff of Deakin University
Year of birth missing (living people)
Fellows of the Academy of the Social Sciences in Australia
Fellows of the Australian Academy of Health and Medical Sciences